Alejandro Fiore (born July 5, 1969) is an Argentine actor. He has worked in Los Simuladores, a miniseries that received the Golden Martín Fierro award.

References

Argentine male actors
People from Buenos Aires
1969 births
Living people